Line 15 (Silver) is one of the six lines that make up the São Paulo Metro and one of the thirteen lines that make up the Metropolitan Rail Transportation Network. It is South America's first mass-transit monorail and is the first system in the world to use the Bombardier Innovia Monorail 300. When completed it will be the largest and highest capacity monorail system in the Americas and second worldwide only to the Chongqing Monorail. The first section, from Vila Prudente to Oratório, opened on 30 August 2014, initially running 10 AM–3 PM on weekends only. , the line is operational from 4:40 AM–12 AM. The line has a free connection to Line 2-Green on Vila Prudente station and future connection to CPTM Line 10-Turquoise on Ipiranga station.

The proposed completion of the full line is projected to be beyond 2022.

History 
 December 2009: Construction initiated
 30 August 2014: Vila Prudente-Oratório, operating Saturdays and Sundays only, from 10AM to 3PM
 20 December 2014: Vila Prudente-Oratório (2.9 km), operating every day from 9 AM to 2 PM
 10 August 2015: Vila Prudente-Oratório, operating every day from 7 AM to 7PM
 26 October 2016: Vila Prudente-Oratório, operating every day from 4:40 AM to 12 AM
 6 April 2018: São Lucas-Vila União, operating Mondays to Fridays from 10 AM to 3 PM
 12 January 2019: São Lucas-Vila União, operation every day from 4:40 AM to 12 AM
 26 August 2019: Vila União-Jardim Planalto, operation every day from 4:40 AM to 12 AM
 16 December 2019: Sapopemba-São Mateus, operation every day from 10 AM to 3 PM
 23 December 2019: Sapopemba-São Mateus, operation every day from 9 AM to 4 PM
 6 January 2020: Sapopemba-São Mateus, operation every day from 4:40 AM to 12 AM
 29 February – 1 June 2020: Line 15 was shut down for more than 3 months. Parts of a Bombardier M20 stock fell on Avenida Sapopemba and all the trains were taken to the railyard for inspection. The São Paulo Metro Company triggered the operation of emergency buses to transport passengers from each station of the closed line.
 1 June 2020: Line 15 reopened between stations Vila Prudente and Jardim Planalto
 18 June 2020: Line 15 reopened between stations Vila Prudente and São Mateus
 29 December 2021: Jardim Colonial opened 
 2025: Ipiranga, Boa Esperança and Jacu-Pêssego, opening planned
 08 March 2023 : It had the Second Accident of two compositions in frontal colliding, between Sapopemba and Jardim Planalto Stations. No one Injured.

Stations 

Obs.: Stations in bold are under construction. Stations in italic are in planning.

Gallery

See also 
 List of monorail systems
 Line 17 (São Paulo Metro)

References 

São Paulo Metro
Monorails
Sao 15
Railway lines opened in 2014
2014 establishments in Brazil